The Royal Festival Hall Live – 10 June 2001 is a live double album of English folk/rock singer-songwriter Roy Harper's 60th birthday concert at the Royal Festival Hall in London.

Track listing
All songs were written by Roy Harper, except where noted.

Disc one
intro – 2:46
"Commune" – 5:01
intro – 0.19
"I'll See You Again" – 4:49
intro – 2:28
"Rushing Camelot" – 9:21
intro – 1:14
"North Country" – 5:32
intro – 2:11
"Another Day" – 3:33
intro – 2:42
"Hallucinating Light" – 6:24
"Same Old Rock" – 12:22

Disc two
intro – 3:34
"Sexy Woman" – 6:50
intro – 4:49
"Key To The Highway" (Broonzy) – 3:49
intro – 1:26
"Sophisticated Beggar" – 4:57
intro – 4:23
"Highway Blues" – 6:56
intro – 1:28
"Twelve Hours Of Sunset" – 5:26
intro – 1:10
"Me And My Woman" – 14:55
intro – 1:29
"The Flycatcher" – 5:27
intro – 1:07
"The Green Man" – 7:49

Personnel 

Roy Harper- Guitar, Vocals
with
David Bedford and the Bedford Strings (CD 1 – tracks 4, 8, 10; CD 2 – tracks 10, 12)
Troy Donockley – whistles, Uilleann Pipes (CD 1 – track 6)
Nick Harper – Guitar (CD 1 – track 12, 13; CD 2 – tracks 8, 12, 14)
Jeff Martin – Guitar (CD 2 – track 2)
John Renbourn – Guitar (CD 2 – tracks 4, 6)
Andy Roberts – Guitar (CD 1 – track 10; CD 2 track 14)
Ric Sanders – Fiddle (CD 2 – track 8)

References

External links 
Roy Harper Official Site
Roy Harper Resource

Albums recorded at the Royal Festival Hall
Roy Harper (singer) live albums
2001 live albums